The 1915 Penn State Nittany Lions football team represented the Pennsylvania State University in the 1915 college football season. The season was the first coached by Dick Harlow, with Lawrence Whitney as an assistant coach. The Nittany Lions played their home games in New Beaver Field in State College, Pennsylvania.

Schedule

References

Penn State
Penn State Nittany Lions football seasons
Penn State Nittany Lions football